Simiuttap Ikerasaa (old spelling: Simiútap Ikerasâ) is a strait in Avannaata municipality in northwestern Greenland.

Geography 
The strait is located in central Tasiusaq Bay. With a small Simiutaq skerry in the middle, the strait separates Tasiusaq Island in the west, from the mountainous Qaqaarissorsuaq Island in the east.

References 

Tasiusaq Bay
Straits of the Upernavik Archipelago